Richard Adrian Newman (born 5 August 1970) is an English football coach and former professional footballer who played as a utility player.

He notably played in the Premier League for Crystal Palace for several seasons and in the Football League for Millwall, Reading, Brentford and Aldershot Town. Described as a "tough tackler", he also played non-League football for Maidstone United and Cranleigh.

Following retirement he briefly moved into coaching and managed Aldershot Town's reserve team during the 2008–09 season.

Career

Crystal Palace 
Newman began his career in the youth system at Crystal Palace and signed his first professional contract in January 1988. Palace's promotions through the divisions meant that Newman had a slow start to life at Selhurst Park, but after winning a First Division championship medal at the end of the 1993–94 season, he went on to become a regular in the Premier League during 1994–95, making 46 appearances and scoring three goals. Newman left Crystal Palace in July 1995, having made 62 appearances and scored three goals during seven-and-a-half years as a professional at Selhurst Park.

Maidstone United (loan) 
On 28 February 1992, Newman joined Fourth Division strugglers Maidstone United on loan until the end of the 1991–92 season. He made 10 appearances and scored one goal during his spell.

Millwall 
Newman joined First Division club Millwall for a £500,000 fee on 19 July 1995. He made 41 appearances and scored one goal during a 1995–96 season in which the Lions occupied either of the two automatic promotion places between August and December 1995 and collapsed in the second half of the season to suffer relegation to the Second Division. Newman remained with Millwall for four further seasons in the Second Division and departed The Den in July 2000, having made 168 appearances and scored five goals.

Reading (loan and permanent transfer) 
On 18 March 2000, Newman joined Second Division club Reading on loan until the end of the 1999–00 season. He made seven appearances and scored one goal during his spell and joined the Royals on a permanent basis on 25 July 2000. He featured as virtual ever-present during the 2000–01 season, before suffering a cruciate ligament injury after 49 minutes of a 2–2 draw with Walsall on 21 April 2001.

After two operations on his right knee, Newman returned fit for the 2002–03 pre-season. With the Royals now playing in the First Division, a back injury delayed Newman's comeback until 7 September 2002 and he went on to make 32 appearances during the season. He signed a new one-year contract during the 2003 off-season and turned down a move to Leyton Orient to secure another extension one year later. Newman was released by the Premier League-bound club at the end of the 2004–05 season and in just over five years at the Madejski Stadium, he made 137 appearances and scored two goals.

Brentford 
Newman joined League One club Brentford on a one-year contract on 10 June 2005. The move reunited him with manager Martin Allen, previously assistant manager at Reading. Newman was named captain, but was sidelined by an injury to his right knee in July, which required three operations to correct. Newman finally made his debut in a Football League Trophy first round shootout defeat to Oxford United on 18 October 2005 and played the full 120 minutes. He was a presence in the midfield, amassing 10 yellow cards and one red during the course of the 2005–06 season. Promotion-chasing Brentford's season came to an end after a 3–1 aggregate defeat to Swansea City in the playoff semi-finals. Newman was released in May 2006 and made 39 appearances and three goals during the 2005–06 season.

Aldershot Town 
Newman dropped down to the Conference Premier to join Aldershot Town on a free transfer on 1 August 2006. He made 41 appearances during the 2006–07 season and signed a new one-year contract at the end of the campaign, but was forced to undergo surgery on a cartilage problem in July 2007. Newman returned to the team on 1 September 2007 and had a successful season, winning the Conference Premier title (which secured promotion to the Football League) and the Conference League Cup. In May 2008, Newman signed a new one-year contract and was named as reserve team coach by manager Gary Waddock. He made 19 appearances during his final season of professional football and was released in May 2009, due to budget constraints. During his three seasons at the Recreation Ground, Newman made 92 appearances and scored two goals.

Cranleigh 
Newman returned to football when he joined Surrey County Intermediate League (Western) First Division club Cranleigh early in the 2010–11 season. He had a successful first season with the club, scoring 11 goals in 24 appearances and winning promotion to the Premier Division. He played on with the club in the Premier Division for three further seasons and made his final appearance, at age 43, on 25 January 2014.

Honours
Crystal Palace
Football League First Division: 1993–94
Reading
 Football League Championship: 2004–05
Aldershot Town
Conference Premier: 2007–08
Conference League Cup: 2007–08
Hampshire Senior Cup: 2006–07
Cranleigh
 Surrey County Intermediate League (Western) First Division: 2010–11

Career statistics

References

External links

Ricky Newman at premierleague.com
Ricky Newman at readingfc.co.uk

1970 births
Sportspeople from Guildford
Living people
Association football midfielders
English footballers
Crystal Palace F.C. players
Maidstone United F.C. (1897) players
Millwall F.C. players
Reading F.C. players
Brentford F.C. players
Aldershot Town F.C. players
English Football League players
Premier League players
National League (English football) players
Footballers from Surrey